Leon "Lenny" Welch (born May 31, 1938) is an American MOR and pop  singer.

Early years
He was born in New York City, United States, and raised in Asbury Park, New Jersey, by his godparents, Eva and Robert Richardson. He attended Asbury Park High School. When he was 16 years old, Welch participated in the initial rehearsal of The Mar-Keys in Asbury Park, his first time singing for another person.

Career
In 1960, Welch signed with Cadence Records. His biggest hit, a cover version of the big band standard "Since I Fell for You," reached number 4 on U.S. Billboard Hot 100 in 1963, selling a million copies. His other hits included "Ebb Tide" in 1964, which was featured in the film Sweet Bird of Youth; and "You Don't Know Me." He also recorded the first vocal version of "A Taste of Honey" in 1962 and performed the theme to the 1967 CBS TV series Coronet Blue. Welch reimagined Neil Sedaka's "Breaking Up is Hard to Do" as a torch song, which became a minor Top 40 hit in 1970; six years later, Sedaka himself would re-record the song in Welch's style to make it a top-10 hit of his own.

Later years 
After Welch's recording career ended, he resumed his education, attending night school after driving a taxicab during the day. He first achieved a high school equivalency degree, then graduated from the College of New Rochelle with a bachelor's degree. He also began singing for commercials, first for Subaru and later for products that included Coca-Cola, M&M's, and Mini-Oreos.

From 1990-1991, Welch joined The Royal All Stars (The Doo Wop All Stars), first of the "supergroups" to be formed bringing together singers from different groups to perform. This group consisted of Welch, Vito Balsamo from Vito & the Salutations, Artie Loria from The Earls, Randy Silverman from The Impalas and Eugene Pitt from The Jive Five. They became a mainstay in the "doo wop" circuit and toured relentlessly in the following years.

Discography

Studio albums
Since I Fell for You (1963) (US No. 73)
Two Different Worlds (1965)
Rags to Riches (1966)
Lenny (1967)
It's All About Love (2005)

Compilation albums
Anthology (1958-1966) (1996)

Singles

References

Further reading

Articles
 "Welsh Spreads 'Changa Rock' Dance Craze". Billboard. May 29, 1961.
 Jones, Debra. "Singer Lenny Welch; 20-year hit". New York Amsterdam News. February 25, 1984.
 Mullen, Shannon. "All About Lenny Welch". Asbury Park Press. November 5, 2005. pp. E1, E9.
 Jordan, Chris. "Just Cruising Along; Asbury Park's Lenny Welch is not making waves". Home News Tribune. May 1, 2010.
 Jordan, Chris. "He's the 'Man'; George Benson strums his way through the area". Home News Tribune. October 14, 2011.
 Jordan, Chris. "Greetings from 'Mr. Asbury Park'". Home News Tribune. Dec 13, 2013.

Books
 Musso, Anthony M. (2009). Setting the Record Straight: The music and careers of recording artists from the 1950s and early 1960s ... in their own words. Bloomington, IN: AuthorHouse. pp. 307-313. .

External links
 Official website
 

1938 births
Living people
American male singers
Asbury Park High School alumni
People from Asbury Park, New Jersey
Singers from New Jersey
Cadence Records artists
Kapp Records artists